Luigi Rossi (1597–1653), was an Italian composer

Luigi Rossi may also refer to:
Luigi de' Rossi (1474–1519), Italian cardinal
Luigi Felice Rossi (1805–1863), Italian composer
Luigi Rossi (painter) (1853–1923), Swiss painter
Luigi Rossi (sport shooter) (born 1933), Italian sport shooter
Luigi Rossi di Montelera (1946–2018), Italian company manager and politician

See also
Rossi (disambiguation)